is a former Japanese football player.

Playing career
Mori was born in Isahaya on 16 October 1972. After graduating from high school, he joined Mazda (later Sanfrecce Hiroshima) in 1991. However he could not play at all in the match until 1994. In 1995, he debuted and became a regular player as center back. However he lost his regular position for injury in 1996 and he moved to Avispa Fukuoka in July. He became a regular player as right and left defender of three backs defense. In 2000, he moved to J2 League club Consadole Sapporo. He played as right defender of three backs defender with Yoshihiro Natsuka and Kensaku Omori. In 2000, the club won the champions and was promoted to J1 League. Although he played many matches in 2001, he could hardly play in the match for injury from 2002. He retired end of 2003 season.

Club statistics

References

External links

biglobe.ne.jp

1972 births
Living people
Association football people from Nagasaki Prefecture
Japanese footballers
Japan Soccer League players
J1 League players
J2 League players
Sanfrecce Hiroshima players
Avispa Fukuoka players
Hokkaido Consadole Sapporo players
Association football defenders